Alborz University of Medical Sciences (ABZUMS) is a medical school in Alborz Province of Iran.

Located in the city of Karaj, the university was established in 2010.

The university offers degrees in 7 schools including residencies and fellowships, and administers all major hospitals and clinics throughout the Karaj city and province of Alborz.

Faculties 

Faculty of Medicine
Faculty of Dentistry
Faculty of Pharmacy
Faculty of Health
Faculty of Paramedical Sciences
Faculty of Nursing and Midwifery
Faculty of Medical Urgency

See also
Higher Education in Iran

External links
Official website

References 

A*
A*
Educational institutions established in 2010
Education in Alborz Province
2010 establishments in Iran
Buildings and structures in Alborz Province